"Meant to Be" is a song recorded by American singer Bebe Rexha featuring American country music duo Florida Georgia Line, from Rexha's third extended play (EP) All Your Fault: Pt. 2 and later included in her debut studio album Expectations (2018). It was sent to American contemporary hit radio on October 24, 2017, by Warner Bros. Records as the second single from the EP. It was nominated for Best Country Duo/Group Performance at the 61st Annual Grammy Awards. Rexha's acoustic version of the song without Florida Georgia Line was released on April 6, 2018.

Commercial performance
"Meant to Be" entered the US Billboard Hot 100 at number 61 on the chart dated November 11, 2017. It later peaked at number two, kept out of the summit by Drake's "God's Plan". It became Rexha's third top ten hit and her first as a solo lead artist, as well as the second top ten hit for Florida Georgia Line. It is Rexha's highest-charting single on the chart, surpassing "Me, Myself & I".

It also debuted atop the US Hot Country Songs chart, becoming Rexha's first entry on that chart and Florida Georgia Line's sixth number one. Rexha also became the first female artist to ever debut atop the chart, while "Meant to Be" is the third song overall to start at the summit since 2012, when the chart transitioned to a hybrid data list, blending airplay, streaming and sales. When the song spent an eleventh week in the top spot in February 2018, it surpassed Taylor Swift's "We Are Never Ever Getting Back Together" as the longest-running number one song on the chart for a lead female artist.  In August 2018, the song broke the record previously held by 2017's "Body Like a Back Road" by Sam Hunt for the most weeks at number one on the US Hot Country Songs chart. After spending 50 weeks at the top, it was dethroned by Kane Brown's "Lose It". The song has sold 1,413,000 copies in the United States as of March 2019. In 2020, it was certified diamond for selling over 10 million units in the US.

Music video
The music video was filmed in Albuquerque, New Mexico and directed by Sophie Muller. It was released on October 23, 2017. As of June 2021, the video has over 1 billion views on YouTube.

Accolades

Track listing
Digital download
"Meant to Be" (Acoustic) – 2:38

Digital download
"Meant to Be"  – 3:02

Charts

Weekly charts

Year-end charts

Certifications

Release history

References

External links
 

2017 songs
2017 singles
Warner Records singles
Bebe Rexha songs
Florida Georgia Line songs
Music videos directed by Sophie Muller
Songs written by Bebe Rexha
Vocal collaborations
Songs written by Tyler Hubbard
Billboard Hot Country Songs number-one singles of the year
Songs written by David Garcia (musician)
Song recordings produced by Joey Moi